PHQ may refer to:

 Patient Health Questionnaire
 Postal Headquarters card - PHQ card
 The Monument Airport, IATA airport code "PHQ"